Karel and I (Karel a já) is a 1942 Czechoslovak comedy film, directed by Miroslav Cikán. It stars Jiří Dohnal, Jana Dítětová, Jaroslav Marvan.

References

External links
Karel and I (Karel a já) at the Internet Movie Database

1942 films
Czechoslovak comedy films
1942 comedy films
Films directed by Miroslav Cikán
Czechoslovak black-and-white films
1940s Czech films